Joaquín Matías Papaleo (born 23 March 1994) is an Argentine professional footballer who plays as a goalkeeper for Güemes.

Career
Papaleo started his career with Unión Santa Fe. He was part of the club's squad for the 2014, 2015 and 2016 seasons, appearing on the substitutes bench twenty-six times but failing to make an appearance. In July 2016, Papaleo joined Primera B Nacional side Santamarina on loan. He made forty-five appearances in 2016–17, which preceded Santamarina resigning Papaleo for the 2017–18 Primera B Nacional after he had returned to Unión. Papaleo was selected in a further twenty-four fixtures. He returned to Unión in July 2018, subsequently making his club debut on 2 September in the Santa Fe derby against Colón.

A third loan move to Santamarina was completed in July 2019. Twenty appearances followed. In September 2020, Papaleo was unveiled as a new loan signing for Temperley for the rest of 2020. On 10 February 2021, Papaleo terminated his contract with Union and signed a permanent one-year deal with Temperley. On 3 January 2022, 27-year old Papaleo joined fellow league club Club Atlético Güemes on a one-year deal.

Career statistics
.

References

External links

1994 births
Living people
People from La Capital Department, Santa Fe
Argentine footballers
Association football goalkeepers
Primera Nacional players
Argentine Primera División players
Unión de Santa Fe footballers
Club y Biblioteca Ramón Santamarina footballers
Club Atlético Temperley footballers
Sportspeople from Santa Fe Province